Baishizhou station is a station of Shenzhen Metro Line 1. It opened on 28 September 2009. It is located at the underground of the intersections of Shennan Dadao and Shahe Road, Baishizhou, Nanshan District, Shenzhen, China.

Station layout

Exits

References

External links
 Shenzhen Metro Baishizhou Station (Chinese)
 Shenzhen Metro Baishizhou Station (English)

Railway stations in Guangdong
Shenzhen Metro stations
Nanshan District, Shenzhen
Railway stations in China opened in 2009